Wasikowski is a masculine Polish surname, its feminine counterpart is Wasikowska. Notable people with the surname include:

Mark Wasikowski, (born 1971) American college baseball coach
Mia Wasikowska (born 1989), Australian actress

See also 
Wosikowski

Polish-language surnames